Scopula perornata is a moth of the family Geometridae. It is found in Mozambique.

References

Moths described in 1905
perornata
Moths of Africa